The Chocavento Tower (Edificio Chocavento) is a high-rise office building located in the San Isidro district of Lima, Peru, built in 2001. At a height of 107 meters, is the third highest building in Peru, surpassed by the "Centro Civico de Lima" (Civic center of Lima) at 109 meters, the "Westin Libertador Hotel" at 120 meters and the "Banco Continental (BBVA) Building" at 132 meters.
The Chocavento building has 25 storeys above ground and five below ground. Its construction cost US$15.3 million.

External links
 Emporis.com
 Second tallest building in Peru up to 2010 when it is displaced to the third place by the new tallest building: the Westin Libertador Lima Hotel

Buildings and structures in Lima
Skyscrapers in Peru
Skyscraper office buildings

Office buildings completed in 2001